Rävåsens IK is a sports club in Rävåsen in Karlskoga, Sweden, established in 1941.

The women's soccer team played in the Swedish top division in 1978 and 1979.

References

External links
Rävåsens IK 

1941 establishments in Sweden
Football clubs in Örebro County
Sports clubs established in 1941
Sport in Karlskoga